USS Tramp (SP-646) was a United States Navy patrol vessel in commission from 1917 to 1919.

Tramp was built as a private wooden-hulled steam yacht of the same name by the Herreshoff Manufacturing Company at Bristol, Rhode Island, in 1901. On 13 July 1917, the U.S. Navy acquired her from her owner, Raymond B. Price of New York City, for use as a section patrol boat during World War I. She was commissioned as USS Tramp (SP-646) in 1917.

Assigned to the 2nd Naval District in southern New England, Tramp performed patrol duties for the rest of World War I.

Tramp was sold to Butler and Company of Boston, Massachusetts, on 28 March 1919.

References

NavSource Online: Section Patrol Craft Photo Archive Tramp (SP 646)

Patrol vessels of the United States Navy
World War I patrol vessels of the United States
Ships built in Bristol, Rhode Island
1901 ships
Individual yachts